ROKS Chungbuk (FFG-816) is the fifth ship of the Incheon-class frigate in the Republic of Korea Navy. She is named after the province, Chungbuk.

Development 

In the early 1990s, the Korean government plan for the construction of next generation coastal ships named Frigate 2000 was scrapped due to the 1997 Asian financial crisis. But the decommissioning of the  destroyers and the aging fleet of Ulsan-class frigates, the plan was revived as the Future Frigate eXperimental, also known as FFX in the early 2000s.

The Republic of Korea Navy initially wanted twenty-four 3000 ton frigates to replace the Ulsan, Pohang and -class coastal fleet of 37 ships. It was later decided that six 2700 ton ships will be constructed for the first batch. In 2008, the plan was further downgraded to 2300 tons when president Lee Myung-bak took office, with the number of ships for the first batch down to six. 8 ships are planned for the second batch of FFX with the final goal of 20-22 frigates.

Construction and career 
ROKS Gangwon was launched on 12 August 2014 by STX Offshore & Shipbuilding and commissioned in November 2015.

On 21 November 2016, she had an open day visit aboard her for the 75th Anniversary of the Royal New Zealand Navy.

References

2014 ships
Incheon-class frigates
Ships built by STX Offshore & Shipbuilding